The New York City College of Technology (City Tech) is a public college in New York City. Founded in 1946, it is the City University of New York's college of technology.

History
City Tech was founded in 1946 as The New York State Institute of Applied Arts and Sciences. The urgent mission at the time was to provide training to GIs returning from the Second World War and to provide New York with the technically proficient workforce it would need to thrive in the emerging post-war economy. From its beginnings as an Institute—to being chartered as a community college—and subsequently transitioning to senior college status during the 1980s—it has grown from serving 246 students in 1946, to a population today of more than 30,000 degree and non-degree seeking students.

Students and faculty
City Tech has an enrollment of more than 17,000 students in over 66 baccalaureate, associate, and specialized certificate programs including several engineering technology fields as well as architecture, construction, nursing, hospitality management, entertainment technology, dental hygiene, vision care technology, technology teacher training and paralegal training. Non-degree continuing education is also offered, and serves approximately 14,000 students each year. City Tech is accredited by the Middle States Commission on Higher Education.

Schools and departments

School of Technology and Design

Departments
Communication Design formerly Advertising Design & Graphic Arts
Architectural Technology
Computer Engineering Technology
Computer Systems Technology
Construction Management & Civil Engineering Technology
Electrical Engineering Technology
Entertainment Technology
Environmental Control Technology
Mechanical Engineering Technology

School of Professional Studies
The eleven departments housed in the school provide instruction at the associate and baccalaureate levels, leading to degrees in the areas of healthcare, business, hospitality, paralegal studies, human services and career and technology teacher education.

Departments
Business
Career & Technology Teacher Education
Dental Hygiene
Restorative Dentistry
Health Services Administration
Hospitality Management
Human Services
Nursing
Law/Paralegal Studies
Radiologic Technology & Medical Imaging
Vision Care Technology
Business Technology
Biomedical Informatics

School of Arts and Sciences
The School of Arts and Sciences is home to a number of majors: transfer degrees in Liberal Arts and Liberal Arts and Science, associate degrees in computer science and chemical technology, and the baccalaureate degree in applied mathematics. The school is also home to a new and rapidly growing bachelor's degree program in Biomedical Informatics, which is at the intersection of IT and biomedical research.

Departments
African American Studies
Biological Sciences
Chemistry
English
Humanities
Mathematics
Physics
Social Science

Library
The college hired its first library director in 1957. The current college library building went up around 1987. In 2012 the library staff adopted an open-access policy to make its members' professional research publicly accessible online.

Campus

City Tech occupies nine buildings within Downtown Brooklyn's Tech Triangle, MetroTech BID and DUMBO. College Administration and Offices, the Ursula C. Schwerin Library, the School of Professional Studies, and the School of Arts & Sciences are primarily based in a complex formed by the Namm, Library (formerly Atrium), General, and Pearl buildings in MetroTech (300 Jay Street). The School of Technology & Design is primarily based in Voorhees Hall in DUMBO with Graphic Arts based in the MetroTech Complex.

A supertall skyscraper designed by Renzo Piano, which would have been known as City Tech Tower and contain 65 floors for the college and 600 units of housing, was proposed, but scrapped.

In October, 2013, City Tech held a ceremonial groundbreaking to mark the construction of a new 350,000 square foot academic complex at the corner of Tillary and Jay Streets in Downtown Brooklyn, which would open in August, 2018. The new complex occupies the site formerly occupied by the Klitgord Center.

The new eight-story building, known as the Academic Complex, is home to City Tech's expanding programs in healthcare and the sciences. The departments moved into the new building include the core sciences: Physics, Chemistry and Biological Sciences (including Biomedical Informatics). It is also home to the health programs: Nursing, Radiologic Technology & Medical Imaging, Dental Hygiene, Restorative Dentistry, and Vision Care Technology. The Academic Complex includes a 1,000-seat concert hall quality auditorium, the largest of its kind in Downtown Brooklyn.  A wellness center and faculty office space is also located in the Academic Complex.

Athletics
City Tech teams participated as a member of the National Collegiate Athletic Association's Division III. City Tech began CUNYAC competition in the community college section from the conference's inception in the 1987-88 season, later to join its senior college section in the 1999-2000 season. Men's sports included basketball, cross country, soccer, tennis and volleyball; while women's sports included basketball, cross country, softball, tennis and volleyball. City Tech's athletic program is in hiatus until new facilities are available.

Notable alumni
Eric Adams, 110th Mayor of New York City (2022–present); 18th Borough President of Brooklyn (2014-2021) 
Hiroaki Aoki (Restaurant Management, 1963), Olympic wrestler and founder of the Benihana chain of restaurants
Charles Barron, New York City Council member representing the 42nd District of New York City; former Black Panther
 Moses Michael Levi Barrow (born Jamal Michael Barrow; 1978), better known by his stage name Shyne, Belizean rapper and politician
Zev Brenner, an Orthodox Jewish radio host; president and founder of Talkline Communications
Salvatore Cassano (Fire Protection, 1970), New York City Fire Commissioner
Larry R. Felix (1980), Director of the Bureau of Engraving and Printing
Robert Holden, professor and New York City Council member
Michael Lomonaco (Hotel and Restaurant Management, 1984), chef, restaurateur, and television personality
Julian Niccolini (Hospitality Management) Managing Partner, The Four Seasons Restaurant
Samuel E Vázquez (1991), Visual Artist
William Yosses (Hotel Management), White House Executive Pastry Chef and coauthor of the book Desserts For Dummies'
Ray Sharkey, Stage, Film, and TV Actor ( Attended for one year)

Notable faculty
 Leon M. Goldstein (died 1999), President of Kingsborough Community College, and acting Chancellor of the City University of New York
Frank McCourt, the Pulitzer Prize-winning author of Angela's Ashes, taught in the English department. In a 1997 New York Times'' Op-Ed essay, Mr. McCourt wrote about his experiences teaching immigrant mothers at New York City Technical College during the Spring 1990 semester.
 Rob Redding - talk host, journalist, author, and artist
Norma Merrick Sklarek - first African American woman licensed to practice architecture in New York and California; Harlem-born, Columbia University graduate. Taught architecture courses in the mid-1950s.

References

External links

 Official website

City University of New York
Universities and colleges in Brooklyn
Educational institutions established in 1946
1946 establishments in New York City
Science and technology in New York City
Downtown Brooklyn
Universities and colleges on Long Island